Elvia Vega-Samos is a Belizean politician. She is MP for Corozal Bay and Minister of State in the Ministry of Human Development, Families & Indigenous People's Affairs.

References

See also 

 Cabinet of Belize

Living people
Year of birth missing (living people)
Government ministers of Belize
Women government ministers of Belize
21st-century Belizean women politicians
21st-century Belizean politicians
Members of the Belize House of Representatives for Corozal Bay
People's United Party politicians